HMS Fiji was the lead ship of her class of 11 light cruisers built for the Royal Navy shortly before the Second World War. Completed in mid-1940, she was initially assigned to the Home Fleet and was detached to escort a force tasked to force French West Africa to join the Free French. The ship was torpedoed en route and required six months to be repaired. Fiji was then assigned to Force H where she helped to escort convoys to Malta. The ship was transferred to the Mediterranean Fleet in early May 1941. After the Germans invaded Crete a few weeks later, she was sunk by German aircraft on 22 May after having fired off all of her anti-aircraft ammunition.

Description
The ships were powered by four Parsons geared steam turbines, each driving one shaft, using steam provided by four Admiralty 3-drum boilers. The ships' complement was 733 officers and ratings in peacetime and 900 during war.

The armament of the Fiji-class ships consisted of a dozen BL 6-inch (152 mm) Mk XXIII guns in four three-gun turrets, one superfiring pair fore and aft of the superstructure. Their secondary armament consisted of eight 4-inch (102 mm) Mk XVI dual-purpose guns in four twin turrets. Anti-aircraft defence for Fiji was provided by two quadruple 2-pounder ("pom-poms") AA guns and two quadruple mounts for Vickers  AA machineguns. The cruisers also carried two above-water triple torpedo tube mounts for  torpedoes, one mount on each broadside.

The Fiji class lacked a full waterline armour belt. They carried an aircraft catapult and two Supermarine Sea Otter or Walrus seaplanes.

Construction and career
Fiji, the only ship of the Royal Navy to be named after the Crown colony of Fiji, was laid down by John Brown & Company at their Clydebank shipyard on 30 March 1938. The ship was launched on 31 May 1939 and completed on 5 May 1940. She was the first of the Fiji class to enter service (Royal Navy classes were generally named after the lead ship of a class). She was initially assigned to the Home Fleet. The flooding gave her a list to port; to counter it the ammunition from the forward turrets was thrown overboard and the portside torpedoes were ejected over the side. While under repair she was fitted with a Type 284 gunnery radar and another pair of quadruple Vickers 0.50-inch AA machineguns were added.

She returned to service in March 1941 and was assigned to patrol the Denmark Strait for German commerce raiders. She missed the homeward-bound heavy cruiser  on 26–27 March, and in early April she was reassigned to Force H at Gibraltar to blockade the German heavy ships then stationed at Brest. With Force H, she sailed into the Mediterranean to support operations to relieve the island of Malta in late April. On 5 May Force H departed Gibraltar to escort a heavily-laden convoy bound for Egypt (Operation Tiger); Force H only escorted the convoy halfway through the Mediterranean before the Mediterranean Fleet took over. Fiji joined the fleet at that time.

Battle of Crete

British intelligence anticipated that the Germans would attack the island of Crete on 17 May and Admiral Andrew Cunningham, commander of the Mediterranean Fleet, ordered his ships to sea on the 15th. Force B, Fiji and the light cruiser  were tasked to patrol west of the island. The ships rendezvoused the following morning and German air attacks began a few hours later, although with little effect other than to help exhaust the ships' anti-aircraft ammunition. That afternoon, Cunningham ordered the cruisers to disperse into their original groups and search for any troop convoys in the Aegean. The Germans spotted Force B shortly after dawn on 22 May as the cruisers were steaming south to rendezvous with the battleships again. Fiji was not hit during these attacks, but was damaged by near misses that knocked out her aft anti-aircraft director.

Force B made the rendezvous with Force A1 (Rear Admiral H B Rawlings) and Force D (Rear Admiral Irvine Glennie) at about 08:30 and the combined force was ordered to report on their levels of high-angle anti-aircraft ammunition. Of the cruisers,  had 40%,  38%, Fiji 30%,  25% and Gloucester only 18%. Ajax, Orion and Dido were ordered to return to Alexandria with Glennie's Force D to rearm but Gloucester and Fiji remained with Rawlings' Force A1.

At 12:25 Force A1, stationed 20 to 30 miles west of Antikythera, received a request from Rear Admiral Edward Leigh Stuart King to support the damaged  and the rest of his Force C. Force A1 headed east into the Kythera Channel, rendezvousing with Force C between 13:30 and 14:00. As the more senior admiral, King took command, with air attacks now inflicting damage on both forces. The two destroyers having already been ordered to rescue the survivors of the destroyer , which had been sunk at 13:50. Writing in despatches after the battle, Cunningham stated that King was unaware of the shortage of anti-aircraft ammunition in Fiji and Gloucester. At 14:13 King and Rawlings exchanged messages about the shortage of ammunition within both Force C and Force A1, with Rawlings expressing concern about the orders given to Gloucester and Fiji. Following this communication, King issued an order to recall both Gloucester and Fiji at 14:57.

The Luftwaffe focused its attention on the four ships dispatched to Greyhound and they were under near-constant attack for several hours. By 15:30, while attempting to rejoin Force A1, Fiji had exhausted its supply of four-inch anti-aircraft ammunition and was reduced to firing practice rounds. She closed on Gloucester at 15:50, right when that ship was struck by four bombs and was near-missed by three others. Fiji dropped life rafts, but was forced to depart the area with the two destroyers. These ships fought on and shot down one attacker and severely damaged two others. The aerial attacks continued despite the heavy cloud cover; at 19:00 a Messerschmitt Bf 109 fighter bomber struck the cruiser amidships with a bomb. The forward boiler and engine rooms flooded and gave her a severe list. Despite this damage Fiji was able to maintain a speed of  until another Bf 109 hit her with another bomb that increased her list to 30 degrees. Abandon ship was ordered in the face of the uncontrollable flooding and she capsized around 19:30. Her accompanying destroyers were unable to rescue any of the crew until after dark when almost all of them were recovered.  Kit Tanner, the ship's chaplain, was posthumously awarded the Albert Medal (since replaced by the George Cross) for repeatedly entering the sea to rescue men from the water.

On 30 May 1941, in a letter to the First Sea Lord, Sir Dudley Pound,  Cunningham wrote, "The sending back of Gloucester and Fiji to Greyhound was another grave error and cost us those two ships. They were practically out of ammunition, but even had they been full up I think they would have gone. The Commanding Officer of Fiji told me that the air over Gloucester was black with planes."

Following the loss of both Fiji and Gloucester to air attacks after their anti-aircraft ammunition was exhausted, all British cruisers were instructed to not allow their anti-aircraft ammunition reserves to fall below 40%.

Notes

References

Further reading

External links
WWII cruisers
HMS Fiji at Uboat.net
The True Experiences of Mr Leonard Charles, a crewman aboard the ship

 

Crown Colony-class cruisers of the Royal Navy
Ships built on the River Clyde
1939 ships
World War II cruisers of the United Kingdom
World War II shipwrecks in the Mediterranean Sea
Maritime incidents in May 1941
Ships sunk by aircraft during the Battle of Crete
Ships sunk by German aircraft
Cruisers sunk by aircraft
Shipwrecks of Greece